Events from the year 1946 in France.

Incumbents
Chairman of the Provisional Government (also Prime Minister): 
 until 26 January: Charles de Gaulle
 26 January-24 June: Félix Gouin
 24 June-28 November: Georges Bidault
 28 November-16 December: Vincent Auriol (interim)
 starting 16 December: Leon Blum

Events
16 January – Charles de Gaulle resigns as a head of a French provisional government.
20 January – Charles de Gaulle resigns as President of France.
6 March – Ho Chi Minh signs an agreement with France which recognizes Vietnam as an autonomous state in the Indochinese Federation and the French Union.
19 March – French Guiana, Guadeloupe, Martinique and Réunion become overseas départements of France.
7 April – Syria's independence from France is officially recognised.
5 May – Constitutional Referendum held and proposed constitution rejected.
2 June – Legislative Election held.
5 July – The bikini, designed by Louis Réard, is first modeled by Micheline Bernardini at the Piscine Molitor in Paris.
13 October – Constitutional Referendum held and constitution approved, creating the French Fourth Republic.
10 November – Legislative Election held for the first National Assembly of the Fourth Republic.
December – Severe winter weather.
12 December – Léon Blum founds a government of socialist parties in France.
16 December – Luxury brand Christian Dior is established in Paris by designer Christian Dior.
24 December – French Fourth Republic founded.

Births

January to June
14 February – Tina Aumont, actress (died 2006)
7 April – Colette Besson, Olympic athlete (died 2005)
17 April – Alain Dorval, voice actor
13 May – Jean Rondeau, motor racing driver and constructor (died 1985)
16 May – Jean-Michel Gaillard, politician (died 2005)
17 May – Philippe Tillous-Borde, entrepreneur and engineer (died 2022)
19 May – André the Giant, professional wrestler (died 1993)
17 June – Gérard Grisey, composer (died 1998)

July to December
22 July – Mireille Mathieu, singer
25 July – Nicole Farhi, sculptor and fashion designer
30 September – Claude Vorilhon, leader of Raëlian Movement
8 October –  Jean-Jacques Beineix, film director (died 2022)
6 November – Romain Argyroudis, soccer player
18 November – Pierre Chanal, soldier and suspected serial killer (died 2003)
8 December – Jacques Bourboulon, photographer
17 December – François Lamoureux, European civil servant (died 2006)
24 December – Roselyne Bachelot, politician

Full date unknown
Jacques Hiron, journalist and writer
Denise Pumain, geographer

Deaths
11 February – Ludovic-Oscar Frossard, socialist, communist politician (born 1889)
12 February – Georges Dumas, doctor, psychologist (born 1866)
9 June – Charles Burguet, film director (born 1878)
9 August – Léon Gaumont, inventor, engineer, film pioneer and industrialist (born 1864)
16 September – Henri Gouraud, general (born 1867)
20 September – Raimu, actor (born 1883)
5 October – Cécile Brunschvicg, politician (born 1877)
12 December – Renée Jeanne Falconetti, actress (born 1892)

See also
 List of French films of 1946

References

1940s in France